The 1952 George Washington Colonials football team was an American football team that represented George Washington University as an independent during the 1952 college football season. In its first season under head coach Bo Sherman, the team compiled a 6–2–1 record (5–1–1 against conference records), finished fifth in the Southern Conference, and was outscored by a total of 188 to 149.

Schedule

References

George Washington
George Washington Colonials football seasons
George Washington Colonials football